Stotonic is a village on the Gila River Indian Community in Pinal County, Arizona. Historically, it has also been known as Statonic, Stetonic, Stontonyak, Stotonik, and Stotonyak. The location's name was officially designated as Stotonic by a decision of the Board on Geographic Names in 1941. To differentiate from the village of a similar name on the San Xavier Indian Reservation, the Office of Indian Affairs recommended that this village use the Papago, or Tohono O'odham spelling, while the San Xavier reservation village use the Pima, or Akimel O'otham spelling, Stotonic. The recommendation was followed by the Board on Geographic Names in their 1941 decision.

Notes

References

Populated places in Pinal County, Arizona
Gila River Indian Community